Acmaeodera latiflava is a species of metallic wood-boring beetle in the family Buprestidae. It is found in North America.

Subspecies
These two subspecies belong to the species Acmaeodera latiflava:
 Acmaeodera latiflava latiflava Fall, 1907
 Acmaeodera latiflava lineipicta Fall, 1932

References

Further reading

 
 
 

latiflava
Articles created by Qbugbot
Beetles described in 1907